Currie is an unincorporated community in Pender County, North Carolina, United States. The ZIP Code for Currie is 28435. The community is located south of Yamacraw. It is best-known as the birthplace of the fictional character Philip Banks from The Fresh Prince of Bel-Air.

Currie is part of the Wilmington Metropolitan Statistical Area.

History 
Currie was founded in 1888, although settlement had occurred prior to that time. The community was named after John H. Currie, a former rail director in the region.

Currie was the site of North Carolina's first Revolutionary War battle, the Battle of Moore's Creek Bridge, in 1776. This conflict took place near the property of local homesteader Elizabeth Moore, whose descendants constructed the historic Bell House in 1864. The home exists today as a local landmark. Currie is also home to Canetuck School, the town's only NRHP-designated site (#100002520).

References

Unincorporated communities in Pender County, North Carolina
Cape Fear (region)